Galga is a right tributary of the river Zagyva in the Cserhát mountains and the Great Hungarian Plain, Hungary. It originates at Becske, Nógrád County, at the Hill Szandai. The end of the river is at Jászfényszaru, where it flows into the Zagyva.

Because of the major disasters caused by the river in the 1970s, it became regulated by the Aszód-based GAVIT, which is responsible for Galga and all of the streams flowing into the river.

References 

Rivers of Hungary